On Broadway Volume 3 is the third album of Broadway show tunes by Paul Motian to be released on the German JMT label. Recorded in 1991, it was released in 1993 and features performances by Motian with guitarist Bill Frisell, bassist Charlie Haden, alto saxophonist Lee Konitz and tenor saxophonist  Joe Lovano. The album was rereleased on the Winter & Winter label in 2004.

Reception
The Allmusic review by Thom Jurek awarded the album 4 stars, stating: "In all this is a fine set and perhaps the most successful of the three volumes in this series".

Track listing
 "How Deep Is the Ocean?" (Irving Berlin) - 6:49 
 "I Wish I Knew" (Mack Gordon, Harry Warren) - 6:40 
 "Just One of Those Things (Cole Porter) - 6:12 
 "Crazy She Calls Me" (Bob Russell, Carl Sigman) - 4:15 
 "Tico Tico" (Zequinha de Abreu) - 2:44 
 "Weaver of Dreams" (Jack Elliott, Victor Young) - 6:56 
 "The Way You Look Tonight" (Dorothy Fields, Jerome Kern) - 5:18 
 "A Handful of Stars" (Jack Lawrence, Ted Shapiro) - 6:42 
 "Pennies From Heaven" (Arthur Johnston, Johnny Burke) - 5:20 
 "Skylark" (Hoagy Carmichael, Johnny Mercer) - 5:00 
Recorded August 1991 at Sigma Sound, NYC

Personnel
Paul Motian - drums
Bill Frisell - electric guitar
Lee Konitz - alto saxophone
Joe Lovano - tenor saxophone
Charlie Haden - bass

References 

1992 albums
Paul Motian albums
JMT Records albums
Winter & Winter Records albums